Weismain is a town in the district of Lichtenfels, in northern Bavaria, Germany. It is situated 15 km west of Kulmbach, and 15 km southeast of Lichtenfels.

References

Lichtenfels (district)